Alessandro Rivolta (born 9 June 1962) is an Italian former archer. He competed in the men's individual and team events at the 1992 Summer Olympics.

References

External links
 

1962 births
Living people
Italian male archers
Olympic archers of Italy
Archers at the 1992 Summer Olympics
People from Oleggio
Sportspeople from the Province of Novara
20th-century Italian people